Alexander Vladimirovich Emelianenko (born ) is a Russian mixed martial artist . He is a three-time Russian national Combat Sambo champion and three-time world Combat Sambo champion in the absolute division. He is the younger brother of Fedor Emelianenko.

Background
He is the third child in the family and has an older sister, Marina, an older brother, Fedor, and a younger brother, Ivan.

In his childhood, since his parents were working during the day, Aleksander spent a lot of time on the rough streets. During his early teens, he used to take part in street fights while his parents were working, going so far as being involved in a riot between neighborhoods.

Since his family did not have enough money, his mother used to prepare only a single meal for the entire week for Emelianenko and his brothers and he had to share clothing with his older brother.

Initially studying to become an electrician at the vocational school, Emelianenko finished his studies in 1999 as an electric welder after he was transferred several times to other technical specialties for bad behavior.

When he was a teenager, while his brother Fedor was in the Russian Army, his parents separated and, since then, Emelianenko has had a strained relationship with his father, with whom he rarely speaks.

Martial arts training
Emelianenko started martial arts training at a very early age: his older brother, Fedor, often had to babysit him, and since Fedor did not want to miss his Sambo practice, he took young Alexander with him. At first, Emelianenko only observed the older kids, but soon he started mimicking their movements. He started his formal Sambo training when he joined elementary school, training with Vladimir Mihailovich Voronov.

Besides Sambo, Emelianenko practiced judo, wrestling and boxing and he also participated in other sports like basketball and football. At 16 years old, when he was in training school, his mother forbade him from training boxing but Emelianenko kept doing it in secret.

Also at 16 years old, Emelianenko became a Russian Master of Sport in judo.

In 1999, Emelianenko won the European Sambo championships.

In 2003 he won the World Combat Sambo championships and repeated this feat in 2004 and 2006.

In 2010, during 19–22 February, Emelianenko took part in the Russian Cup of Combat Sambo representing Saint Petersburg, winning the heavyweight tournament (his brother Fedor injured his hand during the tournament) and earning the right to represent Russia at the World Championships.

Emelianenko participated in sambo at Sportaccord Combat Games 2010 in Beijing, where he won the silver medal in the +100 kg category.

Emelianenko has famously said of his fighting prowess, "My punches are like electric trains, if I miss, my opponent would catch a cold."

Mixed martial arts career

The Pride years

On , Emelianenko rebounded with a victory over Brazilian Carlos "Carlão" Barreto by decision at M-1 MFC Middleweight GP, the first time that Emelianenko fought outside Japan.

Emelianenko has commented that he broke one of his hands while punching Morais.

In his third consecutive KO victory, on  Emelianenko defeated Dutch kickboxer Rene Rooze in 28 second with a brutal knockout that left Rooze unconscious for some minutes at Bushido Rotterdam Rumble in the Netherlands.

Emelianenko dominated the entire fight well on his way to a decision victory moving on to the next round off the tournament. Emelianenko  used his brutal striking exchanges during the first round and broke Barnett's nose. Official doctors claimed that Emelianenko  had fever and sickness  before the fight, with the doctors advising him not to fight that night, which he ignored because it was the Openweight Grand Prix, the most important competition at the time.

After Pride
In an interview with Sherdog, Emelianenko stated that he did not train at all for the Werdum fight as his original opponent was not going to be Werdum, and he would like a rematch with him.

On  at Bodog Fight Series II: Clash of the Nations, Emelianenko fought once again in Russia, knocking out American Eric Pele with punches in the first round, the first time that Pele was knocked out in his career.

In his next match, Emelianenko faced Dutch Jessie Gibbs (called Gibson at the time), who was a late replacement for Gilbert Yvel.

This was Bobish's last professional bout as he injured his back in the fight and refused to have surgery.

Affliction controversy
But at the weigh-ins for the event, it was announced that Emelianenko was unable to meet the licensing standards of the California State Athletic Commission (CSAC). Emelianenko was replaced by Gary Goodridge.

Emelianenko denied the rumors about a positive test for Hepatitis B, commenting that he was unable to compete because he was late for his medicals, arriving two days after the scheduled date for his medicals with the CSAC due to visa issues. Due to the health and privacy rules in California, the CSAC was not allowed to comment why Emelianenko was denied a license, but a member of the CSAC commented on a radio show that Emelianenko was not and would not be cleared in California, and that this would stand for all of the United States of America.

After Affliction

The fight ended in under a minute as Bengtsson appeared to fake being knocked unconscious from a light punch. Emelianenko founded his own training team, AE Team, which he started to present in his fight against Bengtsson.

KSW controversy
During , Emelianenko was in talks with Polish promotion KSW (Konfrontacja Sztuk Walki) for a possible match up against strongman Mariusz Pudzianowski and reached a verbal agreement. But on  KSW co-owner Maciej Kawulski stated in a Polsat News interview that Emelianenko would likely not fight in KSW, claiming that Emelianenko had Hepatitis C. Emelianenko denied this and demanded an apology from KSW. During the controversy, a previous opponent of Emelianenko claimed that he believed that Emelianenko had Hepatitis B, not C.

On , Polish MMA promotion Strefa Walk decided to make public the results of medical tests reportedly taken by Emelianenko. These tests are claimed to show that he had none of the varieties of hepatitis and, thus, was fit to fight for the promotion. There has not since been independent verification of the tests results or recognition of the results by independent licensing agencies.

Strefa Walk
After the controversy, Strefa Walk announced a fight between Emelianenko and Strikeforce champion Alistair Overeem, which Bas Boon, head of Golden Glory, confirmed to a Polish MMA website that it was in negotiations, but a few days later Overeem announced on Twitter that he was not going to fight Emelianenko.

On  it was announced that Emelianenko's bout with Mahle was postponed to an unspecified later date due to the injury that Emelianenko received during his fight with Peter Graham.

Emelianenko faced Magomed Malikov at M-1 Challenge XXVIII on 12 November 2011, in Astrakhan, Russia. Emelianenko lost the fight via first-round KO.

Alexander Emelianenko fought Tadas Rimkevicius at M-1 Challenge 31 in St. Petersburg, Russia. Emelianenko won the fight via TKO (punches) at 1:52 of round 2.

In his final match, Emelianenko submitted to a north–south choke from American grappler Jeff Monson in the second round of their contest at M-1 Challenge 35: Emelianenko vs. Monson at the Ice Palace in Saint Petersburg on 15 November 2012. He announced his retirement from MMA competition through an open letter to his fans on 18 December 2012, citing a chronic injury and a lack of time for his family as contributing factors in his decision.

About three months after announcing his retirement, Emelianenko announced that he is making a comeback into MMA with ProFC. His first match since retirement however was at the Legend Fighting Show against American MMA superstar Bob Sapp on 25 May 2013, in Moscow. Alexander defeated Bob Sapp by TKO in Round 1.

Alexander was expected to fight Darrill Schoonover on 25 August at the ProFC 50 event in Rostov-on-Don in Russia, but withdrew due to a knee injury. In a video released on the ProFC website, Emelianenko said that he hoped to go ahead with the much-anticipated rematch with Mirko Cro Cop scheduled for November under the Legend Fighting Show banner.

MMA return
On November 24, 2016, Emelianenko was released from prison.

After his release, he signed a contract with the Akhmat Fighting Club for several fights. Alexander had his first fight on September 27, 2017, as part of the WFCA 42 tournament against Brazilian Geronimo dos Santos. Alexander knocked out his opponent as early as 36 seconds of the first round. Two more victories followed: in December over American Virgil Zwicker at "WFCA 44" and in March 2018 over Pole Szymon Bayor at "Battle of the Volga". Both fights, as well as with the Brazilian, ended with a technical knockout in the first round. Afterwards, Emelianenko signed a contract with the "RCC", in which he fought in parallel with the "WFCA". Under the auspices of the Ural promotion he held 2 fights in Yekaterinburg, which became the main fights of the evening. On May 5, 2018, at RCC 2 he defeated Brazilian Gabriel Gonzaga. n July 9, 2018, at the next tournament, RCC 3, he was stronger than Czech Viktor Pešta. In both fights, Emelianenko managed to knock out his opponents in the second round. On August 18, during the WFCA 50th Akhmat League jubilee tournament in Moscow, Emelianenko faced American Tony Johnson in the main event. The fight ended in a draw (29:28 (Johnson), 29:29, 29:29) by split decision of the judges. On December 15, 2018, Emelianenko was scheduled to fight Brazilian Francimar Barroso at the RCC 5 in Ekaterinburg.  However, in early March 2019 Emelianenko was detained after crashing into two cars while fleeing police and driving under the influence, leading his upcoming bout canceled.  Emelianenko was scheduled to fight another Brazilian, Wagner Prado, at the next tournament, RCC 6 on May 4, 2019, in Chelyabinsk. But because of the incident in Kislovodsk this fight was also cancelled. Later the league cancelled the contract with Alexander. On May 10, 2019, Emelianenko was agreed to fight in the GFC promotion with another Brazilian, Luiz Henrique, which, like the previous two fights, did not take place because of the Russian. This time the reason for Emelianenko's withdrawal was a fall from his bike. On the YouTube channel Sport24's "HukVam" program, Alexander Emelianenko and Magomed Ismailov agreed by phone to fight.  On December 28, 2019, the ACA promotion officially announced their heavyweight bout, which was scheduled to take place in Moscow on April 3, 2020, at ACA 107: Emelianenko vs. Ismailov. However, due to restrictive measures in the capital due to the coronavirus epidemic, the tournament was postponed to July 24, 2020. It later became known that it would not be held in Moscow, but in Sochi. The three-round bout was dominated by Ismailov and ended with the latter winning by technical knockout in the last five minutes.

Emelianenko, as a replacement for Vyacheslav Vasilevsky, faced Márcio Santos was slated to serve as the event headliner at AMC Fight Nights 106. He lost the bout via arm-triangle choke in the first round.

December 16, 2022 Emelianenko fought with a Russian video blogger Svyatoslav Kovalenko. Fight took place within the "Ren TV Fight Club" tournament. Emelianenko lost the fight via split decision.

Boxing career
On , Emelianenko made his professional boxing debut against Khizir Pliev, an army boxing champion from Ingushetia who was also making his professional debut, in a fight that ended in a draw.

On 25 September 2022, Aleksander Emelianenko was knocked out in 13 seconds by Viacheslav Datsik in Moscow at a Hardcore Boxing event.

Outside sports

Personal life
Emelianenko moved from his native city, Stary Oskol, to Saint Petersburg in 2003 where he met his future wife. Before moving out of Stary Oskol, Emelianenko regularly trained with his brother Fedor.

The couple has two daughters one who was born in 2007 and another daughter from Olga's previous relationship.

Originally a member of Red Devil Sport Club after he and his brother Fedor left Russian Top Team, Emelianenko is currently at odds with Red Devil Sport Club's and Fedor's manager Vadim Finkelstein.

Some commentators have put in doubt Emelianenko's prison time because of Japan's strict immigration policy against convicted felons, which normally would not allow him to fight in Japan as he has done, while others point out that some of his tattoos are an indication that he spent some time in prison, although some of his tattoos would indicate a status which he could not achieve at the time of his imprisonment for being too young.

Emelianenko has studied English and, in 2003, he enrolled himself in economics courses at the Belgorod State University from which he graduated in 2009 with a bachelor's degree.

Emelianenko has several tattoos on his body and claims that they do not really have a meaning for him, he just likes them as a hobby.

Emelianenko likes hunting and once told in an interview that he killed a bear by piercing through its throat with a bear spear and then stabbing it in the heart with a knife, a traditional way of Russian bear hunting.

After the 2008 South Ossetia Conflict he went to South Ossetia to train in preparation for his bout against Sang Soo Lee, in a sign of solidarity with the Ossetian people.

In a controversy apparently sparked by Emelianenko's tattoos, a story shown in Russian channel NTV on  presented Emelianenko as a Russian nationalist, equated with Roman Zentsov, which Emelianenko quickly denied, stating that he was only engaged in the development of MMA in his country, with no political motivations, especially for extremist groups.

TV appearances
Emelianenko has made some appearances in TV shows, including a Korean comedy show and Russia Channel One's show Big Races where he participated and lost two teeth in a competition against a bull in 2010.

Emelianenko also participated as one of the protagonists, along with fellow MMA fighter Julia Berezikova and other Russian athletes, in the 2010 Russian TV series starring Yevgeni Sidikhin, Olympic Village.

Sexual assault conviction
Emelianenko was accused of assaulting and raping his former housekeeper Polina Stepanova on 2 May 2014, as well as stealing her passport. Emelianenko pleaded not guilty and claimed the sex was consensual. Prosecutors asked for five years in prison for Emelianenko. On 19 May 2015, Emelianenko was found guilty of sexual assault and sentenced to four and a half years in prison along with a 50,000 rubles ($1000 (US)) fine. On 20 May 2015, his promoter Oleg Rajewski stated that he would appeal the decision. On 24 September 2015, the appeal was declined. Emelianenko was released on parole in October 2016. He returned to MMA competition in 2017.

Championships and accomplishments

Mixed martial arts
Professional Fighting Championships
ProFC Heavyweight Championship (One time)

Sambo
SportAccord
2010 SportAccord World Combat Games Combat Sambo Silver Medalist
Fédération Internationale Amateur de Sambo
2006 FIAS World Combat Sambo Championships Gold Medalist
2004 FIAS World Combat Sambo Championships Gold Medalist
2003 FIAS World Combat Sambo Championships Gold Medalist
1999 European Championships Sport Sambo Gold Medalist
All-Russia Sambo Federation
Russian Combat Sambo National Championship (2003, 2004, 2006, 2010)
Russian Combat Sambo National Championship Runner-up (2012)
Combat Sambo Federation of Russia
Russian Combat Sambo National Championship (2003)
2004 Dagestan Open Combat Sambo Silver Medalist
2003 Union of Heroes Cup Combat Sambo Silver Medalist
2003 Moscow Open Combat Sambo Silver Medalist

Mixed martial arts record

| Loss
| align=center|28–9–1
| Márcio Santos
| Submission (arm-triangle choke)
| AMC Fight Nights 106
| 
| align=center|1
| align=center|3:58
| Syktyvkar, Russia
| 
|-
| Loss
| align=center|28–8–1
| Magomed Ismailov
| TKO (punches)
| ACA 107: Emelianenko vs. Ismailov
| 
| align=center|3
| align=center|3:25
| Sochi, Russia
| 
|-
| Draw
| align=center| 28–7–1
| Tony Johnson
| Draw (majority)
| World Fighting Championship Akhmat 50
| 
| align=center|3
| align=center|5:00
| Moscow, Russia
| 
|-
| Win
| align=center| 28–7
| Viktor Pešta
| TKO (punches)
| RCC: Russian Cagefighting Championship 3
| 
| align=center|2
| align=center|3:52
| Yekaterinburg, Russia
| 
|-
| Win
| align=center| 27–7
| Gabriel Gonzaga
| TKO (punches and knees)
| RCC: Russian Cagefighting Championship 2
| 
| align=center|2
| align=center|3:43
| Yekaterinburg, Russia
| 
|-
| Win
| align=center| 26–7
| Szymon Bajor
| KO (punches)
| Battle on Volga 3
| 
| align=center|1 
| align=center|3:03 
| Tolyatti, Russia
| 
|-
| Win
| align=center| 25–7
| Virgil Zwicker
| TKO (punches)
| World Fighting Championship Akhmat 44
| 
| align=center|1 
| align=center|2:56 
| Grozny, Russia
| 
|-
| Win
| align=center| 24–7
| Geronimo Dos Santos
| TKO (punches)
| World Fighting Championship Akhmat 42
| 
| align=center| 1
| align=center| 0:36
| Moscow, Russia
| 
|-
| Loss
| align=center| 23–7
| Dmitriy Sosnovskiy
| TKO (punches)
| Coliseum FC - New History 2
| 
| align=center| 1
| align=center| 1:43
| St. Petersburg, Russia
| 
|-
| Win
| align=center|23–6
| Jose Rodrigo Guelke
| TKO (punches)
| ProFC 49: Resurrection
| 
| align=center| 1
| align=center| 4:10
| Moscow, Russia
| 
|-
| Win
| align=center|22–6
| Bob Sapp
| TKO (punches)
| Legend Fighting Show: Emelianenko vs. Sapp
| 
| align=center| 1
| align=center| 1:18
| Moscow, Russia
| 
|-
| Loss
| align=center| 21–6
| Jeff Monson
| Submission (north-south choke)
| M-1 Challenge 35
| 
| align=center| 2
| align=center| 3:17
| St. Petersburg, Russia
| 
|-
| Win
| align=center| 21–5
| Konstantin Gluhov
| Decision (unanimous)
| M-1 Challenge 34
| 
| align=center| 3
| align=center| 5:00
| Moscow, Russia
| 
|-
| Win
| align=center| 20–5
| Ibragim Magomedov
| TKO (doctor stoppage)
| M-1 Challenge 33
| 
| align=center| 2
| align=center| 5:00
| Dzheyrakhsky District, Ingushetia, Russia
| 
|-
| Win
| align=center| 19–5
| Tadas Rimkevicius
| TKO (punches)
| M-1 Challenge 31
| 
| align=center| 2
| align=center| 1:52
| Saint Petersburg, Russia
| 
|-
| Win
| align=center| 18–5
| Tolegen Akylbekov
| Submission (kimura)
| Bushido Lithuania: vol. 50
| 
| align=center| 1
| align=center| 4:32
| Almaty, Kazakhstan
| 
|-
| Loss
| align=center| 17–5
| Magomed Malikov
| KO (punch)
| M-1 Challenge 28: Emelianenko vs. Malikov
| 
| align=center| 1
| align=center| 0:23
| Astrakhan, Russia
| 
|-
| Loss
| align=center| 17–4
| Peter Graham
| TKO (leg kicks)
| Draka 5: Governor's Cup 2010
| 
| align=center| 2
| align=center| 2:59
| Khabarovsk, Russia
| Special rules allowing :30 on the ground.
|-
| Win
| align=center| 17–3
| Miodrag Petkovic
| TKO (punches)
| APF - Azerbaijan vs. Europe
| 
| align=center| 1
| align=center| 3:00
| Baku, Azerbaijan
|
|-
| Win
| align=center| 16–3
| Eddy Bengtsson
| TKO (punch)
| ProFC - Commonwealth Cup
| 
| align=center| 1
| align=center| 0:40
| Moscow, Russia
|
|-
| Win
| align=center| 15–3
| Ibragim Magomedov
| TKO (doctor stoppage)
| ProFC: Russia vs. Europe
| 
| align=center| 1
| align=center| 0:51
| Rostov-on-Don, Russia
| 
|-
| Win
| align=center| 14–3
| Lee Sang-Soo
| KO (punches)
| M-1 Challenge 9: Russia
| 
| align=center| 1
| align=center| 2:40
| Saint Petersburg, Russia
| 
|-
| Win
| align=center| 13–3
| Silvao Santos
| KO (punch)
| M-1 Challenge 2: Russia
| 
| align=center| 1
| align=center| 1:34
| Saint Petersburg, Russia
| 
|-
| Win
| align=center| 12–3
| Dan Bobish
| Submission (standing guillotine choke)
| HCF: Title Wave
| 
| align=center| 1
| align=center| 1:09
| Calgary, Alberta, Canada
| 
|-
| Win
| align=center| 11–3
| Jessie Gibbs
| Submission (kimura)
| M-1 MFC: Battle on the Neva
| 
| align=center| 1
| align=center| 3:37
| Saint Petersburg, Russia
| 
|-
| Win
| align=center| 10–3
| Eric Pele
| KO (punches)
| BodogFIGHT: Clash of the Nations
| 
| align=center| 1
| align=center| 4:07
| Saint Petersburg, Russia
| 
|-
| Loss
| align=center| 9–3
| Fabrício Werdum
| Submission (arm-triangle choke)
| 2 Hot 2 Handle: Pride & Honor
| 
| align=center| 1
| align=center| 3:24
| Rotterdam, Netherlands
| 
|-
| Win
| align=center| 9–2
| Sergei Kharitonov
| TKO (knee and punches)
| Pride FC - Final Conflict Absolute
| 
| align=center| 1
| align=center| 6:45
| Saitama, Saitama, Japan
| 
|-
| Loss
| align=center| 8–2
| Josh Barnett
| Submission (americana)
| Pride FC - Total Elimination Absolute
| 
| align=center| 2
| align=center| 1:57
| Osaka, Osaka, Japan
| 
|-
| Win
| align=center| 8–1
| Pawel Nastula
| Submission (rear-naked choke)
| Pride Shockwave 2005
| 
| align=center| 1
| align=center| 8:45
| Saitama, Saitama, Japan
| 
|-
| Win
| align=center| 7–1
| Rene Rooze
| KO (punches)
| Bushido Europe: Rotterdam Rumble
| 
| align=center| 1
| align=center| 0:28
| Rotterdam, Netherlands
| 
|-
| Win
| align=center| 6–1
| Ricardo Morais
| KO (punches)
| Pride Bushido 6
| 
| align=center| 1
| align=center| 0:15
| Yokohama, Japan
| 
|-
| Win
| align=center| 5–1
| James Thompson
| KO (punch)
| Pride 28
| 
| align=center| 1
| align=center| 0:11
| Saitama, Saitama, Japan
| 
|-
| Win
| align=center| 4–1
| Carlos Barreto
| Decision (unanimous)
| M-1 MFC: Heavyweight GP
| 
| align=center| 3
| align=center| 5:00
| Saint Petersburg, Russia
| 
|-
| Loss
| align=center| 3–1
| Mirko Cro Cop
| KO (head kick and punches)
| Pride Final Conflict 2004
| 
| align=center| 1
| align=center| 2:09
| Saitama, Saitama, Japan
| 
|-
| Win
| align=center| 3–0
| Matt Foki
| Submission (rear-naked choke)
| Pride Bushido 3
| 
| align=center| 1
| align=center| 3:16
| Yokohama, Kanagawa, Japan
| 
|-
| Win
| align=center| 2–0
| Angelo Araujo
| TKO (doctor stoppage)
| Inoki Bom-Ba-Ye 2003
| 
| align=center| 2
| align=center| 4:28
| Kobe, Hyogo, Japan
| 
|-
| Win
| align=center| 1–0
| Assuerio Silva
| Decision (split)
| Pride Bushido 1
| 
| align=center| 2
| align=center| 5:00
| Saitama, Saitama, Japan
|

Professional boxing record

Bare-knuckle boxing record

|- 
|Win
|align=center|1–0
| Jeff Monson
|Decision (unanimous)
|Hardcore FC: Russia vs. USA
|
|align=center|3
|align=center|3:00
|Moscow, Russia
|

See also
 List of mixed martial artists with professional boxing records

References

External links

PRIDE profile
PRIDE english profile

1981 births
Living people
Russian male mixed martial artists
Heavyweight mixed martial artists
Super heavyweight mixed martial artists
Mixed martial artists utilizing judo
Mixed martial artists utilizing sambo
Mixed martial artists utilizing boxing
Heavyweight boxers
Russian male judoka
Russian sambo practitioners
People from Stary Oskol
Russian male boxers
Russian rapists
Russian prisoners and detainees
Russian people of Ukrainian descent
Sportspeople from Belgorod Oblast